Wake-on-Ring (WOR), sometimes referred to as Wake-on-Modem (WOM), is a specification that allows supported computers and devices to "wake up" or turn on from a sleeping,  hibernating or "soft off" state (e.g.  ACPI state G1 or G2), and begin operation.

The basic premise is that a special signal is sent over phone lines to the computer through its dial-up modem, telling it to fully power-on and begin operation.  Common uses were archive databases and BBSes, although hobbyist use was significant.

Fax machines use a similar system, in which they are mostly idle until receiving an incoming fax signal, which spurs operation.

This style of remote operation has mostly been supplanted by Wake-on-LAN, which is newer but works in much the same way.

See also
 ACPI
 RS-232 Signals, Ring Indicator
 Wake-on-LAN

Additional Resources
 "Wake on Modem" entry from Smart Computing Encyclopedia

Networking standards
BIOS
Unified Extensible Firmware Interface
Remote control